Robert Artur Winnicki (born 18 July 1985) is a Polish politician who has been a member of the Sejm since 2015. He heads the National Movement political party.

Before entering politics, Winnicki worked as a journalist. He served as a chairman of the far-right All-Polish Youth from 2009 to 2013. In 2012, he founded the National Movement and in 2015, he was first elected in the 2015 Polish parliamentary election running as the main candidate on the list of Kukiz'15 in the 1-Legnica constituency. He was re-elected to the Sejm in 2019, this time running as the main candidate on the list of Confederation Liberty and Independence in the 24-Białystok constituency.

Biography 
Winnicki attended but did not graduate from the University of Wrocław where he studied political science. After his studies he worked in real estate and managed a hotel. He also worked as a journalist. His first political campaign was in 2007 when he unsuccessfully ran in the 2007 Polish parliamentary election as a candidate for the League of Polish Families (LPR). However, his political profile became well known and he was elected Chairman of the All-Polish Youth in 2009 and served until 2013. His tenure as Chairman was the second longest in the Third Polish Republic and through his leadership the organization grew despite the collapse of the LPR. After his tenure ended he was the given the title of honorary chairman.

In 2011, he worked with other nationalist groups to form and officially organize the "Independence March", a manifestation that would take place annually on 11 November, the anniversary of Poland's independence. The march went from being a marginal event to the single biggest annual march in the country. It has created mass controversy abroad.

In 2012 he co-founded the National Movement, which was founded to replace the LPR and the many other fringe nationalist parties which have come and gone through the years. In 2014 it was officially registered as a party and Winnicki became its first chairman.

In 2018, Winnicki and Janusz Korwin-Mikke announced that their parties will be forming a coalition ahead of the elections coming up in 2019. The Confederation Freedom and Independence was formed and officially registered next year.

References 

1985 births
Living people
Catholicism and far-right politics
Polish nationalists
Far-right politics in Poland
Confederation Liberty and Independence politicians
Anti-Islam sentiment in Poland
Members of the Polish Sejm 2015–2019
Members of the Polish Sejm 2019–2023
League of Polish Families politicians
Kukiz'15 politicians